Ēriks Pētersons (1909 in Riga – 1987 in United States) was Latvian footballer and hockey player. Between 1929 and 1939 he played 63 international matches and scored 21 goals for Latvia national team. He also played in Latvian national ice hockey team, where he appeared in eight matches. After World War II Pētersons moved to United States.

Biography
Ēriks Pētersons was first noticed in 1928 when he moved from a third league team directly to the strongest football club in Latvia—Rīgas FK. He started as a center forward but soon changed his position on the field to central midfield in which he still retained his goal scoring abilities. All his career Pētersons played for a single club - RFK. He was the most capped Latvia international footballer before World War II—he participated in 63 of the total 99 matches Latvia played in this time period. He was also the country's best international goalscorer of the 20th century. In 2007, Māris Verpakovskis overtook him in the all-time Latvia scoring list. His last football match in Latvia was in the 1939–1940 season against Olimpija Liepāja as he did not play neither during the first Soviet, nor the German occupation of Latvia. After the war, Pētersons moved to the United States where he played for the Swedish football club Chicago Viking. In 2006 Pētersons was selected as one of the 11 greatest Latvian footballers of the 20th century and by many he is considered the all-time best Latvian footballer.

References 
 
 

1909 births
1987 deaths
Footballers from Riga
Latvian footballers
Latvian ice hockey players
Latvia international footballers
Chicago Vikings players
Association football midfielders
Latvian emigrants to the United States
Latvian World War II refugees
Ice hockey people from Riga